"Nuances of a Theme by Williams" is a poem from Wallace Stevens's first book of poetry, Harmonium.

The italicized first lines make up a poem, "El Hombre", by Stevens' modernist contemporary William Carlos Williams. The poem was first published in Little Review 5 (1918).

References

1918 poems
American poems
Poetry by Wallace Stevens